Paul Devroey is a prominent Belgian researcher and professor specialized in human fertility. He worked more than 30 years in the university hospital of the Vrije Universiteit Brussel, where he directed the Center for Reproductive Medicine. Together with André Van Steirteghem and other colleagues from the Center he developed the Intracytoplasmic Sperm Injection (ICSI) technique, in which a single sperm is injected into an egg-cell. This technique is particularly useful in cases where infertility is caused by poor sperm production, thus solving most problems of male infertility. His center also pioneered various other techniques that increase the chances of successful in vitro fertilization, such as preimplantation genetic diagnosis.

After his retirement from the VUB in September 2012 Professor Devroey joined the team of IVF centre Jan Palfijn Hospital in Ghent, where he focuses on the most challenging cases of infertility.

Paul Devroey (co-)authored over 440 international peer reviewed articles, some of which have over 1000 citations, and three books. Over his career, he has received three national and four internationals research awards, including the IVI award 2007.

External links

Fertility medicine
Living people
Belgian medical researchers
Year of birth missing (living people)